NGC 6590 is a reflection nebula in the constellation of Sagittarius. This nebula is near the similar  reflection nebula NGC 6589. Both nebulas are flanked by red emission nebula IC 1284.

References

External links
 

Sagittarius (constellation)
Reflection nebulae
6590